In molecular biology, VR-RNA is a small RNA produced by Clostridium perfringens. It functions as a regulator of the two-component VirR/VirS system.

VR-RNA regulates numerous genes including:
Toxin-encoding genes plc, colA and cpb2
Other virulence-related genes such as hyaluronidases and sialidase
Possible collagen adhesin gene
Extracellular nuclease, cadA
Enzymes such as Acid phosphatase, Heme oxygenase HemO and N-acetylglucosaminidases
Genes encoding transport proteins
Genes involved in carbohydrate metabolism
Genes encoding transport proteins
Arginine deiminase (ADI) pathway genes
Genes involved in citrate metabolism

VR-RNA regulates the toxin colA (collagenase)  by base-pairing to colA mRNA, the 3′ end of VR-RNA base-pairs to a region in the 5′UTR of the colA mRNA. This induces cleavage of the colA mRNA in the 5′ UTR and leads to stabilisation of the mRNA and increased translation.

See also
Bacterial small RNA

References

RNA
Non-coding RNA